The Lady from the Sea is a play written in 1888 by Norwegian playwright Henrik Ibsen inspired by the ballad Agnete og Havmanden. The drama introduces the character of Hilde Wangel who is again portrayed in Ibsen's later play The Master Builder. The character portrayal of Hilde Wangel has been portrayed twice in contemporary film, most recently in the 2014 film titled A Master Builder.

Characters
 Doctor Edvard Wangel 
Ellida Wangel, his second wife
Bolette, his elder daughter from a previous marriage
Hilda, his younger daughter from a previous marriage
Lyngstrand, a dying would-be sculptor and friend of the Wangels
Arnholm, Bolette's former tutor and possible suitor, and Ellida's former suitor
Ballestad, a painter and friend of the Wangels
The Stranger, a man whom Ellida has a history with and the antagonist

Synopsis
This play is centred on a lady called Ellida. She is the daughter of a lighthouse-keeper, and grew up where the fjord met the open sea; she loves the sea. She is married to Doctor Wangel, a physician in a small fjord town in northern Norway. He has two daughters (Bolette and Hilde) by his previous wife, now deceased. He and Ellida have a son who died as a baby. Ellida is restless and troubled by a former romantic attachment.  Wangel, fearing for Ellida’s mental health, has invited up Arnholm, Bolette’s former tutor, and a former suitor to Ellida, in the hope that he can help Ellida. 

Some years earlier Ellida was deeply in love and engaged to a sailor, but because he murdered his captain he had to escape. Nevertheless, he asked her to wait for him to come and fetch her. She tried to break the engagement, but he had too great a hold over her. The sailor then returns all these years later to claim her. Ellida then has to choose between her former lover or her husband. Dr Wangel finally recognizes her freedom to choose since he understands that he has no other options. This goes in his favour as she then chooses him. The play ends with the sailor leaving and Ellida and Wangel deciding to take up their lives again together.

Production history
 1973: The New York Repertory Company performed The Lady from the Sea at the Gotham Arts Centre in New York City. Robert Kalfin directed.
1977: The Birmingham Repertory Theatre in Birmingham, England, starring Rosemary McHale as Ellida
1979: Vanessa Redgrave starred in Michael Elliott's production with the Royal Exchange Theatre Company at The New Roundhouse in London, England
1988: Stan Wojewodski directed The Lady from the Sea at Centre Stage in Baltimore, Maryland, starring Laila Robins as Ellida
1990: At the Münicher Kammerspiele Schauspielhaus in Munich, directed by Thomas Langhoff
1990: Svein Sturle Hungnes directed at Oslo's National Theatre
1996: Jackson Phippin directed The Lady from the Sea at the Cleveland Playhouse with Kate Skinner as Ellida
2000: Rick Davis directed The Lady from the Sea at Theater of the First Amendment in a new translation by Brian Johnston. 
2002: Directed by Alfred Christie at the Century Centre for Performing Arts
2001: At the Intiman Theatre in Seattle, adapted by Jim Lewis and directed by Kate Whoriskey
2006: As part of the Spring 2006 season, Sara Cronberg directed The Lady from the Sea at the Municipal Theatre (Stadsteater) in Stockholm, Sweden
2015: At the Shaw Festival The Lady from the Sea was directed by Erin Shields with Moya O’Connell as Ellida.
2020: Directed by Leon Mitchell in Kragerø, Norway, starring Katrina Syran as Ellida

Adaptations
 Kvinnan från havet (The Woman from the Sea) is a ballet by choreographer Birgit Cullberg, and based on Ibsen's play. The ballet was premiered at the Royal Opera, Stockholm, with ballerina and actress Kari Sylwan in the title role.
Sounding, a mixed-media performance adaptation of The Lady from the Sea, was performed at the HERE Arts Centre in New York City as part of HERE's annual CULTUREMART.
 Vom Meer. Opera with music by Alexander Muno and a libretto by Francis Hüsers. World premiere: 29 April 2011, Opernzelt, Heidelberg
 The Lady from the Sea. Opera by Craig Armstrong (music) and Zoë Strachan (libretto). World premiere: 29 August 2012, Edinburgh International Festival
 The Lady from the Sea, a BBC Radio 3 adaptation by Frank McGuinness and starring Lia Williams as Ellida, originally broadcast on 1 November 2009 and re-broadcast on 3 May 2015.
 Sagara Kanyaka, Malayalam adaptation of the play, produced by India's Abhinaya Theatre Research Centre and Australian composer Robert Davidson
The Lady from the Sea by Henrik Ibsen, a Cinalight adaptation directed by Leon Mitchell and starring Katrina Syran as Ellida. Produced in Kragerø, Norway in 2020 for international broadcast

References

External links

 

1888 plays
Plays by Henrik Ibsen
Norwegian plays adapted into films